Hartman Arena is a privately managed 5,000-seat multi-purpose arena in Park City, Kansas, United States.  It is located northwest of I-135 and 77th Street North in the north Wichita metro area.

History
Ground was broken on March 25, 2008, and the arena opened the last week of March 2009. The architecture firm of Law-Kingdon Inc. designed the facility. Tickets.com and Hartman Arena have a multiyear ticketing service agreement.

Hartman Arena hosts home games of the Wichita B-52s of the Major Arena Soccer League. It also hosts the Kansas State High School Activities Association Class 6A and 5A State Wrestling Tournaments. They were moved here after one year at Intrust Bank Arena.

The arena hosted the Wichita Wild of the Champions Professional Indoor Football League from 2009 until the team folded after the 2014 season. In 2020, the Wichita Force announced it would bring indoor football back to Hartman, but the season was cancelled before it had begun due to the COVID-19 pandemic. The Force then began play for the 2021 season at the Kansas Star Arena instead.

Tenants

Wichita B-52s
Hartman Arena was the home of the Wichita B-52s of Major Arena Soccer League starting with their inaugural 2013–14 season.

Wichita Wild
The Wichita Wild called Hartman Arena home for their Indoor Football League games from 2009 through 2012 and their Champions Professional Indoor Football League games since switching leagues for 2013 and 2014. The team was replaced by the Wichita Force when the CPIFL merged into the Champions Indoor Football.

Wichita Wings
The Wichita Wings will call the Hartman Arena home for their first season in the Major Arena Soccer League 2.

Concerts

References

External links
 

Indoor arenas in Kansas
Sports venues in Kansas
Indoor soccer venues in the United States
Buildings and structures in Sedgwick County, Kansas
Park City, Kansas